The Guru Dronacharya Metro Station is located on the Yellow Line of the Delhi Metro.

History
The station is named after Drona, a master of advanced military arts and guru in the Mahabharata. In November 2015, the station was rebranded after budget airline IndiGo.

Station layout

Facilities
List of available ATM at Guru Dronacharya metro station are

Entry/exit

Connections

Bus
Delhi Transport Corporation bus routes number Badarpur Border - Gurugram Bus Stand, Cyber City - Ballabhgarh, Cyber City - Sector 37 Faridabad, Gurugram Bus Stand - Badarpur Road, Sohna Road - Malviya Nagar Metro, Udyog Vihar - Neharpar serves the station from outside metro station stop. New bus transport service "Gurugaman" Route No 112 has also been availed by the Chief Minister of Haryana, Manohar Lal Khattar from Haryana Vidyut Prasaran Nigam Sector 55-56 to Krishna Chowk Palam Vihar which also includes Sikanderpur as a bus stop that is only 200 mts away from Guru Dronacharya Metro Station and for reaching to the bus stop exit from Gate No 1.

See also
Haryana
Gurgaon
List of Delhi Metro stations
Transport in Delhi
Delhi Metro Rail Corporation
Delhi Suburban Railway
Delhi Monorail
Delhi Transport Corporation
South East Delhi
New Delhi
National Capital Region (India)
List of rapid transit systems
List of metro systems

References

External links

 Delhi Metro Rail Corporation Ltd. (Official site) 
 Delhi Metro Annual Reports
 
 UrbanRail.Net – Descriptions of all metro systems in the world, each with a schematic map showing all stations.

Delhi Metro stations
Railway stations opened in 2010
Railway stations in Gurgaon district
2010 establishments in Delhi